The family name Scurfield appears to be of Old Norse, or Viking origin.  "Scur" in Old English is "shower" as in rain. In Old Norse, "skur" also carries the meaning shower, as in shower of rain, or a shower of arrows.

Notable people with the surname include:

Elizabeth Clare Scurfield (b. 1950): English author of the Teach Yourself Chinese series
George Bazeley Scurfield (1920–1991): English author, poet, and politician
Gordon Scurfield (1924–1996): English biologist and author, with expertise in botany and ecology
Hugh Hedley Scurfield (b. 1935): English actuary; president of Institute of Actuaries
John Scurfield (1951–2009): Canadian judge
Matt Scurfield (b. 1976): American rock drummer
Matthew Scurfield (b. 1948): English film, television and theatre actor
Ralph D. Scurfield (b. 1956): Canadian businessman
Ralph M. Scurfield (b. 1928): American businessman and chairman of the California Horse Racing Board
Ralph Thomas Scurfield (1928–1985): Canadian businessman, co-owner of the Calgary Flames from 1980 to 1985
Dr. Raymond M. Scurfield (b. 1943): American author and expert in war-related trauma
Scott Scurfield: American lawyer and public defender
Sergei Scurfield (b. 1962): Canadian businessman and lawyer
Sonia Scurfield (1928–2018): Canadian businesswoman, co-owner of the Calgary Flames from 1985 to 1994